Prince Paul Marie Bonaparte (19 February 1809 in Canino – 7 September 1827 in Nafplio) fought in the Greek War of Independence.

Paul Marie Bonaparte was the third child of Lucien Bonaparte and Alexandrine de Bleschamp. He studied at the University of Bologna. In March 1827 he secretly left the city, and under an assumed name, went to Greece to take part in the Greek War of Independence. Arriving first at the Ionian Islands, Bonaparte was welcomed on 24 August at Poros by the British Admiral Cochrane, who was entrusted with command of the Greek fleet. Bonaparte served on the flagship frigate Hellas, which after a series of unsuccessful operations stood off in the strait of the island Spetses.

On 6 September 1827, on board the Hellas, Bonaparte was mortally wounded while cleaning his own gun and died the day after.

After the end of the war in 1832, Bonaparte was buried in a mausoleum on the island of Sphacteria, close to the French sailors who fell in the Battle of Navarino.

Ancestry

References

Sources
Dictionnaire de biographie française, tom VI, Paris 1951

French philhellenes in the Greek War of Independence
Paul Marie
1809 births
1827 deaths
Firearm accident victims
Burials in Greece
Deaths by firearm in Greece
Accidental deaths in Greece